The 1908–09 Kentucky State men's basketball team competed on behalf of the University of Kentucky during the 1908–09 season. The team finished with a final record of 5–4.

Schedule

|-
!colspan=12 style="background:#273BE2; color:white;"| Regular Season

References

Kentucky
Kentucky Wildcats men's basketball seasons
1908 in sports in Kentucky
1909 in sports in Kentucky